Eduardo Ferreira Soares (born 17 August 2001), known as Eduardo Schürrle, is a Portuguese professional footballer who plays as a midfielder for the Portuguese club Trofense, on loan from Braga B.

Professional career
Schürrle is a product of the youth academies of ADC Aveleda and Braga. On 20 December 2017, he signed his first professional contract with Braga. He made his professional debut for Braga as a late sub in a 6–0 Primeira Liga win over Arouca on 30 December 2021.

International career
Schürrle is a youth international for Portugal, having represented the Portugal U16s, U18s, and U19s.

Personal life
When he first joined Braga, there was another footballer named Eduardo and to differentiate he got his nickname Schürrle; his manager noted his physical resemblance to the German footballer André Schürrle.

References

External links
 
 

2001 births
Sportspeople from Braga
Living people
Portuguese footballers
Portugal youth international footballers
Association football midfielders
S.C. Braga players
C.D. Trofense players
Primeira Liga players
Liga Portugal 2 players
Campeonato de Portugal (league) players